Odessa Young (born 11 January 1998) is an Australian actress. She is known for her roles in the 2015 feature films Looking for Grace and The Daughter, the latter of which earned her an AACTA Award for Best Actress in a Leading Role. She won further accolades for her performance in the web series High Life in 2017. In 2018, she starred in the films Assassination Nation and A Million Little Pieces. That year, she also made her off-Broadway debut in Days of Rage. In 2020, she starred as Frannie in the post-apocalypse miniseries The Stand, based on the 1978 novel of the same name by Stephen King, and opposite Elisabeth Moss in Shirley (2020), a film about the novelist Shirley Jackson.

Early life and education
Young grew up in Australia, where her father is a musician and her mother a writer. She attended a performing arts high school in Sydney, taking part in theatre productions. Within two days of turning 18, she relocated from Sydney to Los Angeles, California. Two years later, Young moved to Williamsburg, Brooklyn, New York.

Career 
Odessa Young started acting professionally at the age of 11, when she was cast through her drama teacher in the Australian children's show My Place. She acted in television series such as Wonderland and Tricky Business before making the transition into feature film work.

In 2015, she co-starred in the film The Daughter with Geoffrey Rush and Sam Neill. She was cast as "the daughter" after modifying her take on the character to seem less mature than in her first audition. Also in 2015, she acted alongside Radha Mitchell in Looking for Grace, where she played the titular role. Later that year, she was dubbed "Australia's brightest rising star" by Elle Magazine. For her role in The Daughter, Young attracted considerable critical acclaim and won Best Actress in a Leading Role at the 2016 AACTA Awards. Her performance in The Daughter also earned her an award for Best Actress from the Australian Film Critics Association.

In 2016, she was in final negotiations to play the female lead in When The Street Lights Go On on Hulu.

In 2017, Young starred as Genevieve in the web series High Life; for her performance, she won an International Academy of Web Television Award for Best Lead Actress – Drama. In 2018, she won Best Actress at the 5th annual Vancouver Web Series Festival for her role in the same series.

In 2018, she starred in the films Assassination Nation and A Million Little Pieces. That year, she also made her off-Broadway debut in Days of Rage at the Tony Kiser Theater, where she plays the radical Quinn in 1969.

She was cast in The Stand miniseries in 2019. With the Stand, there were four shooting days before lockdown in Vancouver, with shooting picking up again later. Released in 2020, the series features Young as Frannie, with a "new coda co-written by King himself" that gives her a different portrayal than the book in the final episode.

In 2020, Young was cast as a hostess in the HBO Max television series Tokyo Vice, to be directed by Michael Mann and written by J. T. Rogers. She was subsequently replaced by Rachel Keller, when she pulled out of the production over scheduling conflicts related to the COVID-19 pandemic. In the 2020 film Shirley, Young plays Rose, a newly married young woman living in the same house as Shirley Jackson. In 2020, Odessa Young participated in Acting for a Cause, a live classic play and screenplay reading series created, directed and produced by Brando Crawford. Young played Lady Prism in The Importance of Being Earnest by Oscar Wilde. The reading raised funds for non-profit charities including Mount Sinai Medical Center.

Vogue named her one of six actors to watch in 2021. That year, she was also cast in the British film Mothering Sunday.

Filmography

Film

Television

Awards and nominations

References

External links 
 

21st-century Australian actresses
Australian film actresses
Australian television actresses
Living people
Best Actress AACTA Award winners
Place of birth missing (living people)
1998 births